Sean Patrick Wilsey (born May 21, 1970) is the author of the memoir Oh the Glory of It All, published by Penguin in 2005.  

Born and raised in San Francisco, Wilsey is the son of Al Wilsey (1919–2002), a businessman, and Pat Montandon, a socialite and peace activist. He is the stepson of socialite and philanthropist Dede Wilsey. 

Wilsey is a former editor-at-large for McSweeney's Quarterly Concern. His newest book, a wide-ranging series of essays, More Curious, was published by McSweeney's in 2014.

He is married to Daphne Beal, who is also a writer.

Bibliography

Books
 Oh the Glory of It All (2005)
 The Thinking Fan's Guide to the World Cup (As Editor with Matt Weiland and Franklin Foer, 2006)
 State by State: A Panoramic Portrait of America (As Editor with Matt Weiland, 2008)
 More Curious (2014)

Essays and reporting
"Peace is a Beautiful Thing" (11 Apr. 2005)

Interviews
"Interview with Sean Wilsey" (16 Sept. 2014)
"Honest Writing is Funny" (19 Aug. 2014)

References

1970 births
American memoirists
Living people
Writers from San Francisco
American biographers
The New Yorker people